Clarence Alfred "Cam" Theaker (8 December 1912 – 1992) was an English professional footballer who played as a goalkeeper.

References

1912 births
1992 deaths
People from Spalding, Lincolnshire
English footballers
Association football goalkeepers
Spalding United F.C. players
Grimsby Town F.C. players
Newcastle United F.C. players
Hartlepool United F.C. players
English Football League players